Mickaël Germain (born 24 August 1981) is a Guadelopean former professional footballer who played as a goalkeeper. He spent most of his career in France and made five appearances for the Guadeloupe national team.

Career
Germain was born in Saint-Claude, Guadeloupe.

In 2010 he joined Red Star.

Notes

1982 births
Living people
Association football goalkeepers
Guadeloupean footballers
Guadeloupe international footballers
Expatriate footballers in France
Red Star F.C. players
US Créteil-Lusitanos players
Racing Club de France Football players
Olympique Noisy-le-Sec players
Villemomble Sports players
ASA Issy players
UJA Maccabi Paris Métropole players
Paris FC players